The Professional Rodeo Cowboys Association (PRCA) created the ProRodeo Hall of Fame and Museum of the American Cowboy to recognize extraordinary athletes, both human and animal, in the sport of rodeo. Induction into the ProRodeo Hall of Fame is the highest honor for rodeo contestants participating in the PRCA today. Contestants are honored in several categories on a yearly basis. The hall opened its doors in 1979. Since 1979, 250 people, 31 animals and 27 rodeo committees have been inducted. More than 100 are nominated each year, only a few are selected.

Both the PRCA and the ProRodeo Hall of Fame are located in Colorado Springs, Colorado. The ProRodeo Hall of Fame and Museum of the American Cowboy informs the public about rodeo.

Inductees

Human inductees 

*Deceased

Livestock inductees 

*Deceased

Legends of ProRodeo 
In 2006, the hall started honoring cowboys who participate in the rodeo community long after their rodeo career is over, spending their time and energy. The individual is honored in person at the ProRodeo Hall of Fame's annual Wrangler Gold Buckle Gala in Las Vegas, Nevada.
 2022 Mike Cervi
 2021 Clint Johnson
 2020 Bob Tallman
 2019 Cotton Rosser
 2018 Keith Martin
 2017 Michael Gaughan
 2016 Neal Gay
 2015 Mel Potter
 2014 Benny Binion
 2013 Don Gay
 2012 Dean Oliver
 2011 Shawn Davis
 2010 Larry Mahan
 2009 Harry Vold
 2008 Clem McSpadden
 2007 Jim Shoulders
 2006 Jake Barnes

Ken Stemler Pioneer Award 
 2022 John Van Cronkhite
 2019 Guy Elliot
 2018 Kay Bleakly
 2017 Western Horseman Magazine
 2016 Earl and Weldon Bascom
 2015 Brenda Michael
 2014 Ken Stemler

See also
 Lists of rodeo performers
 Bull Riding Hall of Fame
 Professional Bull Riders
 Professional Rodeo Cowboys Association
 ProRodeo Hall of Fame
 American Bucking Bull
 International Professional Rodeo Association
 Bull Riders Only
 Championship Bull Riding

References

External links 
 ProRodeo Hall of Fame
 Official Home Page of the Professional Rodeo Cowboys Association
 History of Rodeo and of the PRCA

 
Sports hall of fame inductees
ProRodeo
Sports halls of fame
Lists of sports awards
Champions